Tim Street is an American writer, producer, director, and new media consultant.  He is one of the pioneers of using the Internet as a story telling device and he is the Creator/Executive Producer of the Popular Viral Video French Maid TV.  CNN referred to Street’s work as “Red Hot”, The Toronto Star said “Prophetic,” Wired News called his first creation, fortheloveofjulie.com, "one of the Internet’s creepiest sites… and one of the most convincing hoaxes to hit the Net." Street has been elected to sit on the advisory board for the Association for Downloadable Media (ADM), an industry association focused on providing advertising and audience measurement standards for episodic and downloadable media. In 2009, he was inducted into the International Academy of Web Television.

Traditional media 
Street's career in entertainment began in 1981 at the Walt Disney World Resort in Orlando, Florida, where he started as a Steam Train Engineer at the Magic Kingdom on the Walt Disney World Railroad.  He soon began creating and producing TV and radio commercials for the various Disney Theme Parks.   In 1993 he moved to Los Angeles and started working for Nickelodeon where he served as one of the producers on hit children's television shows like "What Would You Do?" and "All That."  As founder and president of a Pasadena-based production company, The Spark Factory, Street has produced such TV shows as Elvira’s Raise the Dead, Betty White’s Twelve Games of Christmas, Match Game Blank-A-Thon, Gong Show’s 25th Gong-a-versary, 25th Anniversary of Family Feud, and Spike TV’s Hot Buttered Movie Special, hosted by Jennifer Garner. In addition to television shows, Street is a short form director, having written, directed, and produced promos, commercials, and interstitial programs for cable and network television.  He won the Promax BDA Awards for Directing and Producing Promos 2003 and 2006 and served as a judge for the 2005 Promax BDA Awards Home Entertainment Competition.

Web sites 
In 1999 Street set out to create an interactive story that would use the Internet as a platform.  He came up with a factitious site that appeared to be set up by a man who was madly in love with a young woman named Julie, Fortheloveofjulie.com, which generated millions of page views as well as the attention of the Los Angeles Police Department, Santa Monica Police Department and the Los Angeles County Sheriff's Department. Fortheloveofjulie.com was Street's first foray into interactive web-based media and led to several other sites including My Son Peter (a site by a man who plays hide-and-seek with his son who has been dead), Zach Mango (Jon Cryer's character in The Trouble with Normal), and Fight Club (Tyler Durden's behind-the-scenes online journal.)

Viral videos and podcasting 

French Maid TV was created in 2006 when Street expanded his interactive storytelling to include advertising built into the storyline. Aimed at the 18- to 24-year-old male demographic, French Maid TV consists of short (2-6 minute) videos that teach skills like CPR, How to Share Music, How Barter Online, and How to Share Photos.  Each video is sponsored and the distributed on the Internet and via podcast, where the spread virally.  By using Revver and having sponsored videos, Street has been able to successfully monetize his content  The six episodes have been viewed over 20 million times, have been featured iTunes and as one of YouTube’s top videos.

The Association for Downloadable Media is the newly formed industry association focused on providing standards for advertising and audience measurement for episodic and downloadable media.  Street was nominated for chairperson at the Open Meeting held at the 2007 Podcast and New Media Expo.  He declined the nomination in favor of the other candidates.  Since he became well known for FrenchMaidTV.com, he feared the association may not have been taken seriously with him as chairperson in the inaugural year.

New Media conference 
Street speaks at many national conference on new media:
 New Media Expo 2008 
 NAB Show 2008 
 MacWorld Conference & Expo 2008 
 Digital Hollywood Spring and Fall 2007 
 Podcast Academy #6 2007 
 Podcast and New Media Expo 2007 
 Podcast Academy #4 2006 
 PodCamp West San Francisco 2006 
 Promax & BDA Conference 2004

References

External links

Tim Street Interview from New Media Musings, November 19, 2006
Tim Street Interview on Trend TV at Podcast and New Media Expo 2007

American film producers
American bloggers
American podcasters
Video bloggers
Living people
Year of birth missing (living people)